Nemacheilus huapingensis is a species of ray-finned fish in the genus Nemacheilus, although some authorities place this species in the genus Schistura.

It is a freshwater fish endemic to China.

Footnotes 
 

H
Cyprinid fish of Asia
Endemic fauna of China
Freshwater fish of China
Fish described in 1992